A.S.D. Barletta 1922 is an Italian association football club located in Barletta, Apulia. Currently it plays in Serie D.

Barletta was played in professional league as Società Sportiva Barletta Calcio. In 2015 the club went bankrupt, and a new phoenix club, A.S.D. Barletta 1922, was admitted to 2015–16 Eccellenza on 6 August.

History
The first club was founded in 1922.

At the pinnacle of the club's success, they were promoted to Serie B in the 1987–88 season and remained there until the 1990–91 season.

In the 2007–08 season in Serie D, Barletta finished 2nd in Girone H, qualifying them for the promotional play-offs. They qualified as one of the nine teams in the group stage of the play-offs, but finished second in their group and did not qualify for the semi-finals.  Ranked the best second-placed team in the three groups, it won special promotion to Lega Pro Seconda Divisione, as one of the 5 top teams in the promotional play-offs.

Colors and badge
Their official colors are red and white.

Players

Former players

Gallery

References

External links
 Official site

Football clubs in Apulia
Barletta
Association football clubs established in 1922
Serie B clubs
Serie C clubs
Serie D clubs
1922 establishments in Italy
2015 establishments in Italy
Phoenix clubs (association football)